Porter Peak is the highest mountain in the Bull Run Mountains of northern Elko County, Nevada. It is located in the Mountain City Ranger District of the Humboldt-Toiyabe National Forest.

References

External links 

 
 

Mountains of Elko County, Nevada
Mountains of Nevada
Humboldt–Toiyabe National Forest